Frédéric Gustave Eichhoff (17 August 1799, in Le Havre – 10 May 1875, in Paris) was a French linguist and philologist.

He studied at Paris, receiving his doctorate in 1826 with a thesis on Hesiod. In 1837–38 he worked as a substitute for Claude Fauriel at the Sorbonne, and in 1842 was appointed professor of foreign languages at the Faculty of Letters in Lyon. From 1855 onward, he served as inspector-general for public instruction.

He was a member of the Académie de Stanislas and a correspondent member of the Académie des Inscriptions et Belles-Lettres (1847–75).

Selected works 
 Études grecques sur Virgile, 1825 – Greek studies on Virgil.
 Parallele des langues de l'Europe et de l'Inde, 1836 – Language parallels of Europe and India.
 Histoire de la langue et de la littérature des Slaves, Russes, Serbes, Bohèmes, Polonais et Lettons, 1839 – History of the languages and of the literature of Slavs, Russians, Serbs, Bohemians, Poles and Letts.
 Dictionnaire étymologique des racines allemandes, 1840 – Etymological dictionary of German roots.
 Tableau de la littérature du nord au moyen âge en Allemagne et en Angleterre, en Scandinavie et en Slavonie, 1853 – Table of literature regarding the Middle Ages in Germany, England, Scandinavia and Slavonia. 
 Grammaire générale Indo-Européenne, 1867 – Indo-European general grammar.
 Rig-véda; ou, Livre des hymnes – Rigveda; or, Book of hymns.

References 

1799 births
1875 deaths
Writers from Le Havre
Academic staff of the University of Lyon
Linguists from France
Linguists of Indo-European languages